Bernard Blier (11 January 1916 – 29 March 1989) was a French character actor. 
He was born in Buenos Aires, Argentina, where his father, a researcher at the Pasteur Institute, was posted at the time.

Life and career
His rotund features and premature baldness allowed him to often play cuckolded husbands in his early career. He is notable for being one of France's most versatile and sought-after character actors, performing interchangeably in comedies and dramas. His complete filmography includes 175 titles. He often appeared in Italian films too, particularly in the last decade of his life. He was awarded an Honorary César (the French Oscar) in 1989, 24 days before he died.

Personal life
He is the father of director Bertrand Blier. He has appeared in a number of his son's films, most notably Buffet froid (1979).

Filmography

References

External links

 

1916 births
1989 deaths
Argentine emigrants to France
David di Donatello winners
César Honorary Award recipients
French male film actors
French male television actors
French male stage actors
Male actors from Buenos Aires
20th-century French male actors